Luis Adalberto García Huerta (born 28 July 1995) is a Mexican professional footballer who currently plays for Coras de Nayarit.

References

1995 births
Living people
Mexican footballers
Association football midfielders
Coras de Nayarit F.C. footballers
Ascenso MX players
Liga Premier de México players
Tercera División de México players
Footballers from Nayarit